The Karuo culture (3300 to 2000 BC ) was a Neolithic culture in Tibet. The culture cultivated foxtail millet.

Karuo type site
The type site at Karuo was discovered in 1977 at Chamdo County, Chamdo Prefecture, Tibet and excavated from 1978 to 1979. Over 7,000 artifacts have been discovered at Karuo, including 1,060 stone artifacts, 1,284 pottery shards and 4,755 bone objects. It is one of only a few archaeological sites on the Tibetan Plateau dating back so far, and it is in good enough condition for the foundations of houses to still be found, along with roads, walls, and stone altars in addition to the individual artifacts.

Appearance-wise, the pottery at Karuo shows many similarities with pottery found at Majiayao sites, primarily the later phases, Machang and Banshan; however, the Karuo pottery was made using different methods and appears to be merely imitative. The tool assemblage at Karuo also shows similarities with those found at sites in western Sichuan.

The remains of 34 houses were found at the site. During the earlier stages, the houses at Karuo were round and semi-subterranean. During the later stages, the houses at Karuo were rectangular and subterranean. The later houses were more solidly built and represents a shift to more permanent habitation at Karuo.

Karuo is the site of the oldest permanent settlement in Tibet and represents the earliest evidence for agriculture on the Tibetan Plateau. Agriculturally, the people at Karuo relied primarily on foxtail millet, while some evidence for broomcorn millet was also discovered. The oldest evidence for foxtail millet at Karuo dates to around 3000 BC. The people of Karuo also supplemented their diet with hunting.

The residents of Karuo suddenly abandoned the settlement around 1750 BC. This is likely due to a change in climate, as Karuo likely required optimal conditions (higher temperatures) for foxtail millet to be grown successfully; Karuo coincided with a period of warmer temperatures in the region, and a return to cooler temperatures likely made foxtail millet cultivation at the site untenable. Broomcorn millet requires even higher temperatures for cultivation, so the broomcorn millet found at Karuo must have been obtained from trade with lower elevation sites.

References

Citations

Sources 

 Allan, Sarah (ed., 2005), The Formation of Chinese Civilization: An Archaeological Perspective, 
 Gruschke, Andreas (2004): The Karo culture in: The Cultural Monuments of Tibet’s Outer Provinces: Kham - vol. 1. The TAR part of Kham,  White Lotus Press, Bangkok 2004, S. 166-170. 
 
 Sagart, Laurent, Roger Blench and Alicia Sanchez-Mazas (eds., 2005), The Peopling of East Asia 
 
 7,000 articles discovered at Tibetan cultural site. Asia Africa Intelligence Wire (June 1, 2004)

Neolithic cultures of China
Tibetan archaeology
1977 archaeological discoveries
4th-millennium BC establishments